Sextus Sulpicius Tertullus was a Roman senator active in the mid-2nd century. He held the consulship in 158 with Quintus Sacerdos as his colleague. Tertullus was afterwards proconsular governor of Asia in 173/174. He is known entirely from inscriptions.

References

2nd-century Romans
Imperial Roman consuls
Roman governors of Asia
Tertullus